Aborichthys elongatus is a species of freshwater fish in the stone loach family. A. elongatus is found in North Bengal and Arunachal Pradesh in India.

References

Nemacheilidae
Freshwater fish of India
Taxa named by Sunder Lal Hora
Fish described in 1921